Nevi Skerry is a skerry situated in Scapa Flow in the Orkney Islands.

The schooner, Magnet, was wrecked on Nevi Skerry on 14 March 1847.

References

Uninhabited islands of Orkney
Scapa Flow